Henry Penton  may refer to:

Henry Penton (the elder), MP for Tregony and Winchester
Henry Penton (the younger), MP for Winchester

See also
Penton (disambiguation)